Alex Junior Christian (born 5 December 1993) is a Haitian professional footballer who plays as a left back for Georgian side Telavi.

Career

Club
Alex Christian began his career with Haitian Premier League Side Violette. After a few years with Violette, he moved overseas and joined American semi-pro side Ironbound SC. After a few games with Ironbound, he earned a move to Portugal and was signed by Vila Real.

In January 2015, Christian signed a six-month contract with Vila Real, before joining Boavista in June 2015 until the summer of 2018.

In June 2017, Christian signed for Armenian Premier League club FC Gandzasar Kapan on a one-year contract.

On 11 January 2019, Christian signed for FC Ararat-Armenia. On 21 January 2021, Ararat-Armenia confirmed that Christian had left the club following the expiration of his contract.

International
On 16 May 2019, Christian was named in Haiti's 40-man provisional squad for the 2019 CONCACAF Gold Cup. 
On 23 May 2019, Christian was confirmed in the final squad.

Career statistics

Club

International

Statistics accurate as of match played 18 July 2021

Honours

Club
Gandzasar
Armenian Cup: 2017–18

Ararat-Armenia
 Armenian Premier League: 2018–19, 2019–20
 Armenian Supercup: 2019

References

External links
 
 

1993 births
Living people
Association football defenders
Haitian footballers
Haiti international footballers
Sportspeople from Port-au-Prince
Ligue Haïtienne players
Armenian Premier League players
Kazakhstan Premier League players
Boavista F.C. players
FC Ararat-Armenia players
FC Atyrau players
Haitian expatriate footballers
Expatriate footballers in Portugal
Expatriate footballers in Armenia
Expatriate footballers in Kazakhstan
Haitian expatriate sportspeople in Portugal
Haitian expatriate sportspeople in Armenia
Haitian expatriate sportspeople in Kazakhstan
Copa América Centenario players
2019 CONCACAF Gold Cup players
2021 CONCACAF Gold Cup players